Specified risk material (SRM) is any of various tissues of ruminant animals that cannot be inspected and passed for human food because scientists have determined that BSE-causing prions concentrate there. The term was referred to in the United Kingdom's Specified Risk Material Order 1997 (S.I. 1997/2964), in the United States Department of Agriculture's, and in the Canadian Food Inspection Agency's regulatory response to the first confirmed U.S. BSE case in December 2003.

These can include brains, eyes, spinal cord, and other organs; the exact definition varies by jurisdiction.  Under the new US regulations (69 FR 1862, January 12, 2004), SRMs are:  the brain, skull, eyes, trigeminal ganglia, spinal cord, vertebral column (with some exclusions), dorsal root ganglia (DRG) of cattle 30 months of age and older, the tonsils and distal ileum of the small intestine of all cattle.

BSE

The BSE infective agent has been found to concentrate in specific tissues of BSE-infected cattle.

BSE SRMs

The United States (U.S.) is considered as negligible BSE risk country and Canada is considered as controlled BSE risk country, SRMs are defined as: skull, brain, trigeminal ganglia (nerves attached to brain and close to the skull exterior), eyes, spinal cord, distal ileum (a part of the small intestine), and the dorsal root ganglia (nerves attached to the spinal cord and close to the vertebral column) of cattle aged 30 months or older. On January 12, 2004, the Food Safety and Inspection Service  of the USDA published new rules banning such materials from the human food supply.

In countries classified as undetermined risk, the OIE code recommends SRM removal as follows: tonsils and intestines in cattle at all ages; brains, eyes, spinal cord, skull and vertebral column from animals over twelve months of age.

In the European Union (E.U.), SRMs are excluded by law from the human and animal food chain.

Removal of BSE SRMs

The World Organization for Animal Health (OIE) has established recommendations and guidelines for SRM removal based on the level of risk.  In the U.S., tonsils are removed from cattle of all ages. SRMs must be removed at slaughter and disposed as inedible material. The dorsal root ganglia must be removed during the deboning process and in animals older than 30 months, the vertebral column (excluding the vertebrae of the tail, the transverse processes of the lumbar and thoracic vertebrae, and the wings of the sacrum) is removed to be certain the dorsal root ganglia is extracted in its entirety.

See also
 Advanced meat recovery (AMR)
 Mechanically separated meat (MSM)

References

Meat industry
Cattle
Food safety
Prions